Milad Jahani; is an Iranian football midfielder who played for the Iranian football club Sepahan in the Iran Pro League.

Career

Club
On 12 June 2022, Jahani signed for Armenian Premier League club Pyunik on loan.

References

External links
 
 Instagram on Milad Jahani 

1989 births
Living people
Iranian footballers
Sanat Sari players
Sanat Mes Kerman F.C. players
Gostaresh Foulad F.C. players
Sanat Naft Abadan F.C. players
People from Gorgan
Association football midfielders